ABC Shepparton (call sign: 3GVR) is an ABC Local Radio station based in Shepparton, Victoria, Australia, broadcasting on 97.7 MHz, the frequency formerly occupied by ABC Goulburn Murray in circa 2006. The station is currently an opt-out of ABC Goulburn Murray, with a breakfast show hosted by Matt Dowling between 6:00am and 7:45am each weekday.

Shepparton
Radio stations in Victoria
Shepparton